Pingcha is a rural town in Jingzhou Miao and Dong Autonomous County, Hunan, China. The town is bordered to the north by Outuan Township, to the east by Xinchang Town, to the south by Deshun Township, and to the west by Gaotun Subdistrict of Liping County.

History
After the establishment of the Communist State in 1950, the Pingcha Township was set up. At that time, it was under the jurisdiction of Jinping County, Guizhou Province. In 1955 it came under the jurisdiction of Jingzhou Miao and Dong Autonomous County, Hunan Province. In 1958 it was renamed "Pingcha People's Commune". In 1994 it was upgraded to a town.

Administrative division
As of 2017, the town is divided into ten villages: Pingcha, Xinshan, Mianhua, Malukou, Xiaocha, Shaba, Guantuan, Tielu, Dixiang, Jiangbian, and one community: Pingcha Community.

Geography

Economy
The town's economy is based on nearby mineral resources and agricultural resources. Mineral resources include gold, manganese, antimony and mineral water.

Festival
Lusheng Festival on the fifteenth day of the seventh month of the Chinese calendar is a festival in this town.

Transportation
The Provincial Highway S222 passes across the town northeast to southwest.

References

Towns of Huaihua
Jingzhou Miao and Dong Autonomous County